Charlie Davidson (born January 19, 1972) is a former American football wide receiver/defensive back who played eleven seasons in the Arena Football League (AFL) with the Orlando Predators, Albany Firebirds, Nashville Kats, New York CityHawks, New England Sea Wolves, Toronto Phantoms, Colorado Crush and Austin Wranglers. He played college football at Mississippi State University.

Professional career
Davidson played for the AFL's Orlando Predators in 1996. He played for the Albany Firebirds of the AFL from 1996 to 1997. He played for the Nashville Kats of the AFL in 1997. Davidson played for the AFL's New York CityHawks in 1998. He played for the New England Sea Wolves of the AFL from 1999 to 2000. He played for the AFL's Toronto Phantoms from 2001 to 2002, earning Second Team All-Arena honors in 2001. Davidson signed with the Colorado Crush of the AFL on November 20, 2002 and played for the team during the 2003 season. He played for the Austin Wranglers of the AFL from 2004 to 2005. He was signed by the Orlando Predators on March 7, 2006.

References

External links
Just Sports Stats
College stats

Living people
1972 births
Players of American football from Austin, Texas
American football wide receivers
American football defensive backs
African-American players of American football
Mississippi State Bulldogs football players
Orlando Predators players
Albany Firebirds players
Nashville Kats players
New York CityHawks players
New England Sea Wolves players
Toronto Phantoms players
Colorado Crush players
Austin Wranglers players
21st-century African-American sportspeople
20th-century African-American sportspeople